Kiruna Airport is the northernmost airport in Sweden. It lies around 10 km (6.2 mi) from the town centre of Kiruna. In 2018, the airport served 277,018 passengers.

Future
Kiruna Airport is the chosen destination for the Spaceport Sweden project. Spaceport Sweden is a new venture between Swedish Space Corporation, the Jukkasjärvi Icehotel, LFV Group and Progressum, in which they hope, when its operations start, that Virgin Galactic will make their second base after the USA.

Airlines and destinations
The following airlines operate regular scheduled and charter flights to and from Kiruna:

Helicopter routes
There are scheduled helicopter flights for paying passengers in the mountain region of Kiruna. One such is Nikkaluokta-Kebnekaise mountain lodge, which goes twice daily in the summer season operated by Kallax Flyg.

Statistics

Accidents and incidents
 On 15 March 2012 a Norwegian Lockheed Hercules military transport plane crashed into the Kebnekaise mountain when approaching Kiruna Airport, the Norwegian C-130 Hercules accident. All five personnel on board died.

Ground transportation
Airport Transfer to and from Kiruna City Center available year round for flights to and from Stockholm, operated by Hörvalls Buss on behalf of Kiruna Municipality 
Bus 91 to Abisko - Riksgränsen - Narvik departs one time per day from the airport around february - may and june - september 
Nikkaluoktaexpressen to Nikkaluokta departs once or twice per day in march - may and june - september 
Taxi and airport taxi are available.
Rental cars are available.

References

External links

Spaceport Sweden

Airports in Sweden
Airports in the Arctic
Airport
Buildings and structures in Norrbotten County
International airports in Sweden